The Head Above Water Tour was the sixth concert tour by Canadian singer-songwriter Avril Lavigne. Launched in support of her sixth studio album, Head Above Water (2019), the tour began on September 14, 2019 in Seattle and ended on October 11, 2019 in Bensalem. Initially scheduled to end mid-2020 and early 2021 with a total of 43 concerts, all concerts in Asia and European legs were postponed and eventually cancelled due to the global COVID-19 pandemic. Many international tour dates were moved to the Love Sux Tour in 2022.

Background
The tour was announced by Lavigne on her social media on June 24, 2019. She also announced that a portion of the proceeds from every ticket sold on the tour will be donated to The Avril Lavigne Foundation to raise awareness and fund treatment for those in need. Due to the high demand, extra concerts were added in London, Milan and Tokyo. The concert in Vienna was moved to Wiener Stadthalle, due to high demand in the country. The shows in Italy and Switzerland also had venues upgraded due to the demand. Tickets for Berlin and Cologne shows were sold out three months in advance.

Set list 
This set list is representative of the show on September 14, 2019, in Seattle. It is not representative of all concerts for the duration of the tour.

 "Head Above Water"
 "My Happy Ending"
 "Here's to Never Growing Up"
 "What the Hell"
 "Complicated"
 "It Was in Me"
 "Keep Holding On"
 "Don't Tell Me"
 "When You're Gone"
 "Hello Kitty"
 "Girlfriend"
 "Dumb Blonde"
 "He Wasn't"
 "Sk8er Boi"
Encore
 "I Fell in Love with the Devil"
 "I'm with You"

Notes 
 In Toronto, Lavigne performed "Sk8er Boi" with Michael Clifford of 5 Seconds of Summer.

Tour dates

Cancelled shows

Personnel
Avril Lavigne – lead vocals, rhythm guitar
Steve Ferlazzo – keyboards, music director
Dan Ellis – lead guitar, backing vocals
David Immerman – rhythm guitar, backing vocals
Matt Reilly – bass, backing vocals
Chris Reeve – drums

Notes

References

External links 
 Avril Lavigne Official Website

2019 concert tours
Avril Lavigne concert tours
Concert tours postponed due to the COVID-19 pandemic